Penfield is a northern suburb of Adelaide, South Australia, in the City of Playford.

William Penfold, one of the first settlers in the area, subdivided land he had bought in the Hundred of Munno Para in 1856 to create the township of Penfield. The area was commonly known as Peachey Belt or Peachy Belt. The boundaries have changed over the years, the original township being overshadowed by the government acquisition of land immediately south of the early town centre since the 1940s for construction of military facilities such as the Penfield munitions factory. As a result, much of the modern peri-urban locality of Penfield is used for industrial purposes rather than residential and the original town centre is no longer a population centre.

The remaining part of the Zoar Bible Christian Church, built in 1855, is the small cemetery.

History
Before European settlement, the Kaurna people inhabited the land.

The district was surveyed in 1849, as part of the Hundred of Munno Para. Early settlers arrived in the area in the 1850s, clearing the land to grow cereal crops and graze animals.  William Friend Penfold was one of the first to buy land there, and in 1853 he opened the Plough and Harrow Hotel (which closed in 1893 and was destroyed by fire in 1899). In 1856 he subdivided land he had bought on section 4057, and a village was laid out at the junction of Penfield and Argent Roads (the Argents being another family of early settlers). That intersection is now surrounded on three sides by RAAF Base Edinburgh.

Most of the settlers were converted over to the Bible Christian Church (a Methodist denomination) by Reverend Samuel Keen of Angle Vale. The Zoar Bible Christian Church was built in 1855, which was demolished in 1956, although the small cemetery remains. (It is near the Max Fatchen Expressway, accessed from Argent Road or the Stuart O'Grady Bikeway.)

In the early years, the village had two general stores, a police station, the church and the hotel. Penfield Post Office opened around 1856 and closed in 1951. A government school was opened in 1874 and remained open until about 1940. Another church, Sturton Primitive Methodist Church was further south, and the building still stands in the RAAF property, visible from Sturton Road.

Two possibilities as to the origin of the area's former name, Peachey (or Peachy) Belt, which persisted until 1858, have been suggested: that it came from the native peach trees, or quandongs, which covered the area; or that the surveyor was Peter Peachey and the name came from him.

A report in The Register on 10 November 1859, from a meeting in Peachey Belt, mentions a dinner given by James Philcox (a land speculator who named Evanston) at "Smidt's Hotel" before his departure from the colony in 1853. It is not clear whether this referred to the Plough and Harrow or another hotel in the wider area. The report says that Philcox had urged his 13 tenants to turn their attention to the cultivation of vineyards.

A large amount of land in the area between Penfield and Salisbury was compulsorily acquired by the Australian Government's Department of Munitions in 1940 to establish a munitions factory, the Salisbury Explosives Factory, during World War II. It led to the closure of the Penfield village. That site now includes RAAF Base Edinburgh, Defence Science and Technology Group and industrial premises.

21st century
The boundaries have varied several times before the current precise boundaries were set.

In the 2010s, the eastern part of what was then Penfield was developed for residential housing. On 31 October 2017, this section was excised from Penfield and a new suburb of Eyre was created on the north side of Womma Road and western side of Stebonheath Road.

The western part is mostly an industrial area wrapped around the northern sides of RAAF Base Edinburgh and south of the Max Fatchen Expressway. It includes an intermodal freight terminal on the Adelaide-Port Augusta railway line operated by SCT Logistics with a large warehouse and distribution centre operated for Treasury Wine Estates.

See also
 Penfield railway line serviced the area that is now Edinburgh, initially the World War II munitions factory.
 Penfield 1 railway station
 Penfield 2 railway station
 Penfield 3 railway station
 Penfield (disambiguation)

References

Suburbs of Adelaide